The Bophuthatswana Defence Force (BDF) was established on 6 December 1977 from trainees of the South African Defence Force. It was the defence force of the Republic of Bophuthatswana, a nominally independent bantustan during the Apartheid era of South Africa.

Organisation and structure

A National Guard of about 125 soldiers initially formed the Bophuthatswana National Guard in time for the independence of Bophuthatswana. Initially this group merely performed ceremonial duties and was housed within the office of the President.

A SADF Officer, Brigadier Riekert, served as a military adviser to President Lucas Mangope.
Over time an embryonic Department of Defence was developed resulting in the establishment of the Bophuthatswana Defence Force (BDF) on the 30 November 1979 with Brigadier Riekerk as the Minister of Defence and Lt Col Jack Turner as the Chief of the BDF.

Development of the BDF

Bases and areas of command

The BDF developed military areas and bases at:

1 Military Area covered the region of Mafikeng, Mmabatho, and Lehurutse and housed:
The Molopo base, with One Infantry Battalion, the Military School and the Technical Services Unit
The Lehuru Tshe base, with the Parachute Battalion
2 Military Area covered the region of Mankwe and Moretele and housed:
The Mankwe base, with Two Infantry Battalion, a COIN unit
The Bafokeng base, a company group base
The Odi base, a company group base
3 Military Area covered the region of Thaba’Nchu and Taung and housed:
The Thaba’Nchu base, a company group base and 
The Taung base, a company group base.

Units

One BDF Infantry Battalion 
The first true armed unit formed was One Infantry Battalion based at Molopo, while its training wing eventually formed the Military School.

Technical Services Unit
A Technical Services Unit at Molopo was also formed from a Light Workshop Troop.

Two BDF Infantry Battalion
A second Infantry Battalion was formed and based at Mankwe, specialising in COIN operations.

Parachute and Special Forces
A Parachute Battalion and Special Forces Unit was also formed. Together these units formed the Task Force.

Other Units
	BDF Signals Unit with a Supply Depot was housed at the old Mafikeng Air Base after the establishment of Air Force Base Mmabatho. 
	BDF Supply Depot
	BDF Maintenance Unit

Air Wing

Based at Air Force Base Mmabatho and consisted of:

• A Transport Wing: Operated CASA 212, CASA 235 and Pilatus PC-6

• A Helicopter Wing: Aérospatiale Alouette III and BK 117s

• A Training Wing: Pilatus PC-7

Brigadier M.P. Janse van Rensburg as Chief fell under the Chief of the BDF.

Attempted coup
The establishment of the Bophuthatswana National Security Unit as an addendum to the BDF in 1986 may have contributed to the aborted coup attempt of 2 February 1988. This unit was primarily responsible for the provision of infrastructure. One contentious issue was the low entry requirements for the BNSU compared to that of the BDF, resulting in dissatisfaction.

After the coup was thwarted through the intervention of the SADF, Brigadier Riekert resigned as Minister of Defence and President Mangope personally took over the defence portfolio. The BNSU was disbanded and a small number of former BNSU members were allowed to join the BDF.
For practical reasons, a Defence Committee under the chairmanship of Minister Rowan Cronje was established to assist the Chief of the BDF in dealing with welfare and social issues, since these were considered to be the most important sources of the dissatisfaction which had contributed to the coup attempt. Minister Cronje subsequently took over the defence portfolio in 1991.

Invasion of Bophuthatswana

On 11 March 1994, following a request from President Mangope for assistance from the Afrikaner Volksfront, hundreds of Afrikaner Weerstandsbeweging (AWB) members unlawfully entered Bophuthatswana from South Africa, to "help" restore control in the face of a strike by civil servants, resulting in 42 residents of Mafikeng killed and three AWB members shot dead by a Bophuthatswana Police sergeant.

The unrest ended when SADF was officially requested to assist in restoring safety and security, by General Turner (Chief of BDF). The request was done as per security agreement between the BDF and SADF. Bophuthatswana was then soon thereafter placed under the control of the South African government.

Shortly afterwards, Mangope was removed from power and a temporary administrator was put in place by the South African Transitional Executive Council

General Elections of South Africa and Disbandment
During the historical General Elections of 1994, 2 SSB took part in Operation Baccarat (stability in Mmabatho and Passado (border protection) as a peace force to ensure stability in the North West Province).

On 19 December 1994, the Bophuthatswana Defence Force Parachute Battalion at Gopane was placed under operational command of 2 SSB, as part of the founding of the SANDF. 2 SSB withdrew simultaneously from Nietverdiend and Nooitgedacht. From August 1994 to 15 June 1995 successful bridging training was provided for 550 formerly non-statutory force members.

With the end of Apartheid in 1994 in South Africa, the former defence forces of the bantustans were incorporated into the newly formed South African National Defence Force.

The SANDF's new 10 South African Infantry Battalion heraldry clearly originates from the Bophuthatswana Defence Force, its forebear.

Insignia

Ranks
The ranks of the BDF were:
Officers

Others

Equipment
The BDF was equipped for counter-insurgency (COIN) operations. 
The BDF used:
 R4/R5 assault rifles,
 7,62 mm Light Machine Gun
 40 mm Multiple Grenade Launcher, 
 60 mm and 81 mm mortars and
 M2 12.7mm HMGs.
105mm Recoilless Rifle

Vehicles included Mambas, Buffels, Samil 20, seven-ton Isuzu trucks, and 4x4 vehicles.

Medals

 Bophuthatswana Defence Force Distinguished Gallantry Cross;
 Bophuthatswana Defence Force Merit Decoration;
 Bophuthatswana Defence Force Distinguished Gallantry Medal;
 Bophuthatswana Defence Force Defence Force Merit Medal;
 Marumo Medal Class 1 (Gold);
 Bophuthatswana Defence Force Defence Force Commendation Medal;
 Marumo Medal Class 2 (Silver);
 Bophuthatswana Defence Force Nkwe Medal;
 Bophuthatswana Defence Force General Service Medal;
 Bophuthatswana Defence Force Independence Medal;
 Bophuthatswana Defence Force Medal for Long Service and Good Conduct (Gold);
 Bophuthatswana Defence Force Medal for Long Service and Good Conduct (Silver);
 Bophuthatswana Defence Force Medal for Long Service and Good Conduct (Bronze).

References

Further reading
 

Apartheid government
Organisations associated with apartheid
Defunct organisations based in South Africa
Disbanded armed forces
Military units and formations established in 1977
Military units and formations of the Cold War
Military units and formations of South Africa
Bophuthatswana
Military decorations and medals of Bophuthatswana
Military units and formations disestablished in 1994